Gordon Arthur Poirier (October 27, 1914 – May 25, 1972) was a former Canadian professional ice hockey player. He played ten games for the Montreal Canadiens during the 1939–40 season in the NHL. Poirier was born in Maple Creek, Saskatchewan, but grew up in Montreal, Quebec.

Poirier also played two season, 1933–34 and 1935–36, as player-coach with HC Diavoli Rossoneri Milano in the Italian Serie A where he helped the team win the league championship in 1935–36.

Poirer played a total of six seasons, three before and three after the Second World War, for the Brighton Tigers in the English National League. He helped the Tigers win the league championship in 1946–47 and 1947–48 and to win the English Autumn Cup in 1946. He was inducted into the British Ice Hockey Hall of Fame in 1948. He finished his career after spending the 1950–51 season with the Harringay Racers, also in the English National League.

External links

British Ice Hockey Hall of Fame entry

1914 births
1972 deaths
Brighton Tigers players
British Ice Hockey Hall of Fame inductees
Canadian expatriate ice hockey players in England
Canadian ice hockey centres
Harringay Racers players
Ice hockey people from Saskatchewan
Montreal Canadiens players
Ice hockey people from Montreal